Scirè was the name of at least two ships of the Italian Navy and may refer to:

 , a  launched in 2004.

Italian Navy ship names